Christiane Mancini was a French theater and film actress.

In 1907, she was a student at the Paris Conservatory. In 1909, she studied with Louis Leloir. She played the role of Hermione in Andromaque.

Personal life 
Her sister Cécile Mancini was a singer of the Paris National Opera. In 1908  or 1910, she had a brief affair with Jean Cocteau.

Theater 

 Polyphemus, 1906 
Prostitute, 1910, by Henri Desfontaines 
La Mort de Patrocle, 1921

References

External links 

 Ms Christiane Mancini in the d Aiescha role in the play Men of prey 1907

French actresses